Millencolin / Midtown is a split album by Swedish punk rock band Millencolin and American pop-punk band Midtown, released on 28 May 2001 via Golf Records.

Track listing
Millencolin - "No Cigar"
Millencolin - "Black Eye" (early version)
Millencolin - "Buzzer" (extended version)
Midtown - "Let Go"
Midtown - "Get it Together"
Midtown - "You Should Know"

Personnel

Millencolin
Nikola Sarcevic - lead vocals, bass
Erik Ohlsson - guitar
Mathias Färm - guitar
Fredrik Larzon - drums

Midtown
Gabe Saporta - lead vocals, bass
Tyler Rann - vocals, guitar
Heath Saraceno - vocals, guitar
Rob Hitt - drums

Millencolin albums
Split EPs
2001 EPs
Midtown (band) albums